Cal Schake was an Olympic weightlifter for the United States.  His coach was Marty Cypher.

Weightlifting achievements
1980 Olympic team member
Bronze Medalist in Pan Am Games (1983)
Senior National Champion (1980-1983, 1986 + 1987)
Senior American Record Holder (1972-1992) with a 152.5 kg snatch in the 75 kg weight class

External links
Cal Schake - Hall of Fame at Weightlifting Exchange

American male weightlifters
Weightlifters at the 1983 Pan American Games
Pan American Games bronze medalists for the United States
Living people
Pan American Games medalists in weightlifting
Year of birth missing (living people)
Medalists at the 1983 Pan American Games
20th-century American people